Javier Antonio García Expósito (known as Javier Latorre; born 1963, in Valencia, Spain) is a dancer and choreographer. He debuted at the age of sixteen in the National Lyric Company. In 1979, he joined the National Ballet of Spain, as soloist under the direction of Antonio Gades. After receiving an award as the Festival d'Avignon, he founded in 1988 in Cordoba the Ziryab Danza of which he was director, choreographer and dancer. He had  considerable success with the show Hijas del Alba. A year later, he received three national awards at the Concurso Nacional de Arte Flamenco. In 1990, he toured with  the show La fuerza del destinoall over Europe, and participated as a guest artist with Mario Maya in Diálogos del Amargo. He collaborated on Concierto flamenco para un marinero en tierra with Vicente Amigo  before winning the first prize in dance at the Festival del Cante de las Minas in 1994 .

Choreography and interpretations
 1989 "Hijas del Alba" Ziryab-Danza
 1990 "La Fuerza del Destino" Ziryab-Danza
 1990 "Buscando a Carmen". Serie TV Canal Sur
 1994 "Lances del Arenal". Fundación Cristina Heeren
 1995 "Movimiento Flamenco. Cía. Antonio Marquez
 1995 "Guernica". Cía Antonio Canales
 1997 "Omega". Enrique Morente.Lagartija-Nick
 1997 "Musa Gitana. Cía. Paco Peña.
 1998 "Poeta". Ballet Nacional de España
 1998 "Ombra". La Fura dels Baus
 1998 "Luz de Alma". Ballet Nacional de España
 1998 "Cosas de Payos". Cía Andaluza de Danza
 2000 "Ambivalencia". Cía. Javier Latorre
 2000 "Requiem por Antonio". Cía Javier Latorre
 2000 "5 Mujeres 5". Cía. Eva Yerbabuena
 2001 "Pura Intención". Prod. Gran Teatro de Córdoba
 2002 "Rinconete y Cortadillo". Compañía Javier Latorre
 2003 "Andanzas". Cía. Somorrostro. Taller de Musics
 2003 "Penélope". Ballet Español de Murcia
 2003 "Inmigración". Cía. Angeles Gabaldón
 2004 "El Loco". Ballet Nacional de España
 2004 "Triana, en el nombre De La Rosa". Cía Javier Latorre
 2004 "Tarantos, el musical". Prod. Focus
 2005 "El Celoso". Ballet Español de Murcia
 2006 "Por qué se frotan las patitas?". Musical Cine. Prod. Tesela P.C.
 2006 "Inconnexus XXI". Cía. Somorrostro. Taller de Musics
 2006 "Requiem por la Tierra". Cía. Paco Peña
 2006 "Homenaje a Fosforito". Prod. Gran Teatro de Córdoba
 2006 "Doña Francisquita". Zarzuela, Prod. Teatro Villamarta, Jerez
 2007 "Homenaje al Concurso Nacional de Córdoba". Prod. Gran Teatro de Córdoba
 2007 "4 Poetas en Guerra". Cía. Shoji Kojima
 2007 "Femenino Plural". Cía. Angeles Gabaldón
 2008 "Viva Jerez". Musical Prod. Teatro Villamarta, Jerez
 2008 "El Bateo y De Madrid a París". Zarzuela Prod. Teatro de la Zarzuela
 2008 "El Indiano". Cía. David Morales
 2008 "Hijas del Alba". Ballet Español de Murcia
 2009 "Fedra". Prod. Faraute-Macandé
 2009 "Mi Ultimo Secreto". Cía. Mercedes Ruiz
 2009 "Cálida Hondura". Cía. Daniel Navarro
 2009 "De Córdoba a Cádiz" y "De Aquí y de Allá". Prod. Tablao El Cordobés"
 2009 "Amor de Solana". Talleres coreográficos Centro Andaluz de Danza
 2009 "5 Piezas". Talleres coreográficos Institut del Teatre, Barcelona
 2009 "Flamenco, Flamenco". Musical cine. Carlos Saura
 2009 "La Celestina". Cía. Shoji Kojima
 2010 “El duende y el reloj”. Cía Javier Latorre

References

1963 births
People from Valencia
Spanish male dancers
Spanish choreographers
Living people